The 1990–91 season was the 80th season in Hajduk Split’s history and their 45th and last in the Yugoslav First League. Their 3rd place finish in the 1989–90 season meant it was their 45th successive season playing in the Yugoslav First League.

Competitions

Overall

Yugoslav First League

Classification

Results summary

Results by round

Matches

Yugoslav First League

Sources: hajduk.hr

Yugoslav Cup

Sources: hajduk.hr

Player seasonal records

Top scorers

Source: Competitive matches

Notes
1. Data for league attendance in most cases reflects the number of sold tickets and may not be indicative of the actual attendance.
2. Match abandoned due to crowd trouble. Therefore, the match was awarded to Partizan.

See also
1990–91 Yugoslav First League
1990–91 Yugoslav Cup

References

External sources
 1990–91 Yugoslav First League at rsssf.com
 1990–91 Yugoslav Cup at rsssf.com

HNK Hajduk Split seasons
Hajduk Split